Bledar Devolli (born 15 January 1978) is an Albanian professional football coach and former player.

Club career
He was released by the Flamurtari chairman Shpëtim Gjika on 19 July 2011, along with three other main players, Daniel Xhafaj, Sebino Plaku and Julian Ahmataj.

He joined Shkumbini on 30 July 2012.

International career
Devolli was first introduced to the national team in 2000 when he was called up to participate in the 2000 Rothmans International Tournament. He made his debut on 6 February by playing in the first half of the opening match versus Andorra which finished in a comfortable 3–0 win. His second appearance occurred two days later against Azerbaijan as Albania won 1–0. In the last match Devolli was rested as Albania defeated hosts of Malta to secure the first place with 9 points and the first title.

Management career
Devolli started his management career on 8 July 2014 as he became the new coach of his boyhood club Luftëtari for the 2014–15 season. Following the goalless draw against Butrinti on 8 February 2015 which left the team in penultimate position in Albanian First Division, Devolli resigned from his post. His decision was accepted by club board.

On 28 January 2016, Devolli was appointed the new coach of Albanian First Division side Kamza. He left the duty on 26 March of the following year.

On 5 August 2017, Devolli joined fellow First Division side Bylis in their bid to achieve promotion to top flight. He resigned on 4 October following the goalless draw against Turbina.

He was appointed manager of relegation-threatened Kastrioti in January 2019.

References

External links

1978 births
Living people
Footballers from Gjirokastër
Albanian footballers
Association football midfielders
Albania international footballers
Luftëtari Gjirokastër players
KF Bylis Ballsh players
KF Tirana players
KF Vllaznia Shkodër players
FK Tomori Berat players
KS Lushnja players
KF Elbasani players
KF Skënderbeu Korçë players
KF Teuta Durrës players
FK Partizani Tirana players
Flamurtari Vlorë players
KS Shkumbini Peqin players
Kategoria Superiore players
Albanian football managers
Luftëtari Gjirokastër managers
FC Kamza managers
KF Bylis Ballsh managers
KF KEK managers
FK Tomori Berat managers
FK Dinamo Tirana managers
Albanian expatriate football managers
Expatriate football managers in Kosovo
Albanian expatriate sportspeople in Kosovo